Chaetopsis macroclada is a species of fungus in the genus Chaetopsis.

References

Ascomycota